Soňa Stanovská (born 27 February 2000) is a Slovak slalom canoeist who has competed at the international level since 2015. She competes in C1 and K1 individually, as well as in Mixed C2 with Ján Bátik

She won a bronze medal in the K1 team event at the 2021 World Championships in Bratislava. She also won a gold medal in the C1 team event at the 2022 European Championships in Liptovský Mikuláš.

She has won six medals at the World Junior Championships, with four silvers (C1 team: 2016, 2017; C1: 2017; K1: 2018) and two bronzes (K1 team: 2017; C1: 2018).

World Cup individual podiums

References

External links

2000 births
Living people
Slovak female canoeists
Medalists at the ICF Canoe Slalom World Championships
People from Dolný Kubín
Sportspeople from the Žilina Region